Newfound Regional High School (NRHS) is a public secondary school in Bristol, New Hampshire, United States. Surrounding towns that attend NRHS are Alexandria, Bridgewater, Bristol, Danbury, Groton, Hebron, Hill, and New Hampton. The school is part of the Newfound Area School District (NASD) and was originally named Newfound Memorial High School. It was originally located where Newfound Memorial Middle School currently stands until the present high school building was constructed in 1989. Newfound Regional High School was awarded "NH Excellence in Education" in 2010. Newfound Regional High School's motto is "Choose your path to success...make a commitment."

School district
Newfound Regional High School is part of School Administrative Unit 4. The Superintendent of Schools is Pierre Couture. NRHS is the only high school within the district, and the school board approves most of the decisions. There is currently one high school, one middle school, and four elementary schools located within the district.

Administration
Newfound Regional High School has one principal, one vice principal, and multiple administrative staff positions: Paul Hoiriis became the current principal on July 1, 2015. The past principal, Michael O'Malley, retired at the end of the 2014-2015 school calendar. He had served the district for 30 years.

School culture
Newfound has 34 full-time teachers and 402 students. There is a 6% minority enrollment, mostly made of African Americans and Asians. Newfound Regional High School has an 81% proficiency in reading, while 37% proficient in mathematics.

School board
The School Board Chair for the Newfound Area School District is Jeff Levesque of Groton. The current school board members are Don Franklin of Hebron, Sue Cheney of Alexandria, Vincent Migliore of Bridgewater, John Larsen of Bristol, and Christine Davol of New Hampton. The individual towns decide who is elected to the school board spots.

Student activities
Student activities at Newfound include National Honor Society, Student Council, Math Team, Outing Club, Art Club, Cooking Club, E-Cubed, Geek Culture Club, International Thespian Society, Leo's Club, Literary Magazine, Project Promise, Tech Crew, Student-Staff Senate, Yearbook, Drama, Chorus, and Jazz Band. Newfound offers three varsity sports in the fall: field hockey, soccer, unified soccer, and football. Newfound also offers cross country in the fall. Newfound offers both varsity and junior varsity basketball, Unified Basketball in the winter, as well as spirit and alpine skiing. In the spring, Newfound offers varsity and junior varsity baseball and softball, as well as track & field.

Student-Staff Senate
The Student-Staff Senate (SSS) is made up of students and staff who work on changes to the school. Student-Staff Senate works like the U.S Senate. SSS has committees and subcommittees for each area of topics. SSS currently has 11 subcommittees, including Advisories, Portfolio, Project Promise / Clubs, Performance Assessment, Public Relations, Challenge Day, Change Culture, Student Handbook, Student/Staff Voice, Bylaws, and Athletics. During meetings and proposals, SSS uses Robert's Rules of Order. The main purpose of this Senate is to have student and staff, alike,  convene with each other and use the Senate as a way to discuss matters that the students and teachers bring up.

Student Council
Student Council is made up by the student body along with adult adviser(s). Student Council plans events such as Homecoming, winter carnival, spring fling, etc. Newfound Student Council follows their own Constitution that they've written up and approved by the council. Student Council has separate committees and subcommittees to focus on specific areas. Student Council meetings are run by parliamentary procedures. In order for a Student Council meeting to be in session, there must be a quorum that is met. Along with a quorum, in order to pass approvals (e.g.: fundraiser requests, agendas, ideas, etc.) the body must agree with a majority vote.

Members
Members are selected in various ways. In order to obtain a membership within Student Council you must:
 request to become members-at-large
 be a student representative to the school board (elected by the entire student body)
 be a Student Council representative (elected by your class)
 be a Vice President of your class (elected by your class)

Yearbook
Newfound Regional High School has a body of students who create the annual yearbook. Newfound uses Jostens as their primary yearbook company. Each year, they will dedicate the yearbook to an educator or administrator who exceeded expectations, or to someone who served at NRHS for a long time and is either retiring or leaving their position. The 2014-2015 yearbook was dedicated to Mr. O'Malley who is currently the principal, but will be retiring at the end of this school year. He had served the district for 30 years.

Project Promise
Project Promise is a program offered at NRHS along with other schools in NASD. Project Promise is a program that focuses on academic achievement in various subjects, physical and nutritional programs, and to infuse concepts of learning lifelong habits in hopes to connect with the real world. Project Promise branches off with many of the extra-curricular programs offered at the school. Cooking Club, Fashion Club, Zumba, Homework Club, Fitness Club, Japanese Culture Club, Outdoor Club, Geek Culture Club is all a part of Project Promise. NRHS Project Promise's goal is to " create a safe place that fosters youth voice and excitement among our participants." Project Promise is also a place where they help students transition after high school, and to give students opportunities to be leaders and mentor.

Athletics
Newfound Regional High School is a Division III high school. The only two sports teams that are not in Division III are the spirit team and the football team, which are in Division IV. Newfound offers soccer, field hockey, football, and cross country in the fall. In the winter, they offer basketball, spirit, and alpine skiing. In the spring, Newfound offers baseball, softball, and track and field. The field hockey team were the state champions in 2006 and won back-to-back state championships in 2008 and 2009. In 2017 the field hockey team won the D-III state championship.

Football
The Newfound Regional High School football program started in 2004 but was not funded by the school district. In spite of that, the community created an organization to support the program. It was not until 2008 that the school board approved of supporting the school's football program. In 2005, the Newfound football team won the New Hampshire Interscholastic Athletic Association Sportsmanship Award. Since the beginning of the program, Newfound has yet to win any state titles or runners-up.

On August 23, 2012, Newfound Regional High School added a football field next to the school campus. The school board approved adding a football field at the high school but stated that it would have to come from the taxpayers. To avoid that, the non-profit organization "Friends of Newfound Football" raised enough donations to avoid the expense paid by the taxpayers. Before the addition of the new football field, Newfound was practicing and playing "home" games at the New Hampton School. Newfound's first home game at their new field was on September 8, 2013, against Winnisquam Regional High School. The football field was named "Morrison Field". From the start of the project to the end of the project, it took nine years all together for the field to be ready to be played on.

On November 4, 2018, against Franklin High School, the first ever home state playoff game was held at Morrison Field.

Track and field
The boys' track and field program first started in 1980 by Earl Mills, who ran the program until 1998. Newfound boys' track and field has had 14 individual state champions, along with two state decathlon champions. The following table shows the individual championships:

The girls' track and field team has produced 15 individual state champions since 2004. The first coach for the Newfound girls' track and field team was Peter Cornelissen. The following are the girls' individual championships from Newfound:

Field hockey
The Newfound field hockey team has won four state championships since 2009, most recently in 2017. Ann Hall started the program in 1974, but retired the next year. Karri Peterson has been the current field hockey coach since 2004. The team has won four state championships in Class M/S and D-III under Peterson. Here is the following table:

Girls' basketball
The Newfound girls' basketball team were state champions in 1972 under Class A, and were state runners-up in 1973, 1988, and 2007. 11 Newfound players have scored more than 1,000 points during their high school varsity careers. Ann Hall was the first coach known to have coached the girls' basketball team. The current coach is Karri Peterson, a 1,000-point scorer herself. She also coaches the field hockey team. The latest 1,000 point scorer to Newfound was Ashlee Dukette in 2018. She also became the first Newfound basketball player to achieve 1,000 rebounds, in 2019.  The following table shows the 12 players, and their points achieved overall:

Boys' basketball
The boys' basketball team were state champions in 1995. The coach then was Dan Peters. There are seven players who have scored 1,000 points in their high school varsity careers:

Boys' cross country
Newfound's boys' cross country team was founded in 1978. The team has won state championships in class M/S in 1985, 1986, and 1987, and were runners up in 1990, 2003, and most recently, in 2021. The team had a class S individual championship in 1953.

Girls' cross country
Newfound's girls' cross country was founded in 1978. The team had an individual championship winner in 2005 and 2006.

Communities
Newfound Regional High School serves the New Hampshire towns of Alexandria, Bridgewater, Bristol, Danbury, Groton, Hebron, Hill and New Hampton. On March 18, Hill residents voted to withdraw from the Franklin School District and join Newfound. With two more votes agreeing with the motion, Hill will now have a 10-year tuition agreement with Newfound. The final vote was 75-73. Newfound students sometimes go to the Tapply Thompson Community Center (TTCC) to help out elementary students, or is there for a recreational event.

Annual spring musical
Every spring, the Newfound Drama Department hosts the annual school musical. The community and students from NRHS auditions for roles that they want. The musical usually occur in late April, and they start practicing around February to prepare for the show. The director of the spring musical is Stephanie Wienchek, and she herself was an actor. The spring play had been an annual tradition for 34 years. This year's performance was Once on This Island by Lynn Ahrens.

Academics
Newfound offers Advanced Placement courses. They offer AP Calculus, AP Computer Science, AP US History, and AP Biology. Newfound also offers Virtual Learning Academy Charter School. Also, Newfound offers Jump$tart Coalition for Personal Financial Literacy courses, such as accounting. Newfound also offers Extended Learning Opportunities (ELO). Some courses Newfound has to offer are: Spanish I, II, III, IV, V; French I, II, III, IV, V; Economics, Modern European History, Global Studies, Programming I, II, III AP; Robotics; Chemistry; Living on Your Own (LOYO); Family & Consumer Science. Newfound has partnered up with Plymouth Regional High School so that Newfound can send its students to PRHS for classes such as: Culinary Arts, Health Science, Mechanics, and Marketing. Newfound has to pay PRHS based on tuition basis. Currently, there are 23 CTE students that go to Plymouth Regional High School.

Grades and grading
Newfound goes off of the Summative assessment and Formative assessment continuum. Most of the teachers weigh the summatives as 90% of the overall grade for the quarter and 10% formatives for the overall grade for the quarter. Each quarter (4) is 20% of the overall grade, and exams (midterm/Test (assessment)) are 20% of the final grade. So they factor in 80% from the four quarters, and 20% from the midterm grade and the final exams. That adds up to 100% for the final grade. Formatives would be homework, short essays, and Document-based question. Most of the time, these materials would get you ready for the Summatives. Summatives would be quizzes (sometimes formative), projects, tests, etc. The following table shows the grading table that Newfound goes off of:

Awards

Newfound Regional High School has received some awards as a school, and also as individual awards recognized by the State of New Hampshire and/or individual organizations:

Gallery

References

External links
 School website
 District website

Schools in Grafton County, New Hampshire
Public high schools in New Hampshire
Schools in New Hampshire
Bristol, New Hampshire